The 1982 Victorian Football League (VFL) draft was the second annual national draft held by the VFL, the leading Australian rules football league.

Held on 19 October 1982, all twelve VFL clubs participated in the draft, each having two picks, with the team finishing last in the 1982 VFL season having first choice, followed by the other eleven clubs in reverse finishing position order. Wooden spooners Footscray Football Club named East Fremantle ruckman Andrew Purser as the first pick of the draft.

The draft was limited to players aged sixteen and above in non-Victorian based competitions and tied players wishing to move to Victoria to the club that drafted them.
Eleven South Australians were named, with eight Western Australians, three Tasmanians and two Queenslanders also drafted.

The draft, introduced as an equalisation strategy in response to the increasing transfer fees and player salaries at the time, was discontinued after the 1982 Draft, following requests from Melbourne and Geelong officials to consider a moratorium on interstate transfers, aimed at allowing South and Western Australian clubs hit by the draft to recover. The draft did not reoccur until 1986 and has been held every year since.

References

Australian Football League draft
VFL Draft, 1982
VFL Draft